The Football tournament of the 2006 Lusophony Games was played in Macau, People's Republic of China. The venues were the Campo Desportivo e Pavilhão da U.C.T.M. and the Macau Stadium. The tournament was played from 4  to 10 October 2006, and it was only a men's competition. The tournament was won by favourites Portugal who were represented by their under-20s team, defeating Angola in the final. Cape Verde won the bronze medal defeating Mozambique. The major absentee was the Brazilian team who decided not to take part in the games.

Football medal table by country

First round

Group A

Group B

Group C

Semi-final

Bronze Medal

Gold Medal

Medal winners

References

See also
ACOLOP
Lusophony Games
2006 Lusophony Games

 
football
2006
2006
2006 in Macau football
2006–07 in Portuguese football
2006–07 in Indian football
2006 in African football
2006 in Asian football